Battle of Los Angeles (2017) was the fourteenth Battle of Los Angeles professional wrestling tournament produced by Pro Wrestling Guerrilla (PWG). It was a three-night event which took place on September 1, September 2 and September 3, 2017 at the American Legion Post #308 in Reseda, Los Angeles, California.

The twenty-four man tournament concluded with a three-way elimination match in the final, in which Ricochet defeated Jeff Cobb and Keith Lee. This made Ricochet, the first person to win the Battle of Los Angeles tournament twice, having won for the first time in 2014.

Background
TK Cooper was originally announced for the tournament, but had to pull out due to an injury and was replaced by Joey Janela.

Reception
Jake St-Pierre of 411Mania rated the night one 7.5, praising it as "an emphatic hit" with "sheer variety of styles throughout it". He said that "Crazy lucha is represented with Rey Horus and Fenix, all the way to Big Lads Wrestling with the Monstars vs. The Chosen Bros" He rated the night two 8.0, considering it "a fantastic few hours of pro wrestling", with specific praise towards Joey Janela and Sammy Guevara's match as "one of the most surprisingly quality matches of PWG's 2017." He rated the night three 8.5 stating that it was "a standalone show as well as a capper to this huge weekend". He further stated that "Not only did some of the most memorable moments of the tournament come on Stage 3, but we got North America's Best Match of the Year in Keith Lee vs. Donovan Dijak. That match alone strengthens this show to an unbelievable degree despite some slightly uninspiring Semifinal matches." He said that there were "huge highlights strewn across all three shows, like Janela/Guevara, Travis Banks in general, Keith Lee going on a bender, and the underrated match between Pentagon and Matt Riddle." He rated that the overall shows of the tournament were "damn good three days of pro wrestling that no wrestling fan in their right mind should avoid."

Kevin Pantoja of 411Mania rated the night one 7.0, having "a lot of good sandwiched in between some very average bookends." He stated that "The show opened in decent fashion and closed in disappointment", with "a fair amount to like". He felt "Sabre/Rock told a great story and established Rock in PWG. Penta/Sydal was solid, though could be skipped. Webster/Scurll and Fenix/Horus were battles of guys who knew each other well and it made for high quality matches. The show stealer was the Monstars/Chosen Bros tag and ranks as the only must see match of the night." He rated the night two 8.5, stating that it "delivered" with "not a single bad match on this show". He said that there were "strong tournament matches with the two big tags very well" and the "final two matches were the standouts and they’re both totally different from one another, which is great." He rated the night three 8.5 as "The best of the final BOLA stages", with the overall event being "consistently fun, with nothing being bad" and "Banks/Ricochet and Lee/Dijak were the show stealers".

The quarter-final match between Keith Lee and Donovan Dijak on the night three was awarded the prestigious 5-star rating by Dave Meltzer.

Aftermath
Due to winning the 2017 Battle of Los Angeles, Ricochet received a PWG World Championship title shot against Chuck Taylor at All Star Weekend 13, which he won.

Results

Tournament brackets

References

External links
Pro Wrestling Guerrilla official website

2017 in professional wrestling
Battle of Los Angeles (professional wrestling)
Professional wrestling in California
Professional wrestling in Los Angeles
September 2017 sports events in the United States
2017 in Los Angeles
2017 in California